Blair Phillips (born March 5, 1984) is a former American football linebacker who spent time on the practice squads for both the Dallas Cowboys and the New York Jets of the National Football League. He also played for the Arkansas Diamonds of the Indoor Football League. He played college football at Mississippi Gulf Coast Community College before finishing his career at the University of Oregon.

College career
Phillips played at Mississippi Gulf Coast Community College during his freshman and sophomore years of college. He transferred to the University of Oregon and is famous for blocking the game winning kick at the end of a controversial victory over Oklahoma in 2006.

Professional career
Phillips signed a May 2007 free agent contract with the Dallas Cowboys. Phillips then signed a 2008 free agent contract with the New York Jets. In 2010, Phillips played with the Arkansas Diamonds of the Indoor Football League (IFL).

After football
Currently, he is a head football coach at University Academy of Central Louisiana in Alexandria, Louisiana.

References

External links
 Oregon profile

1984 births
Living people
American football linebackers
Arkansas Diamonds players
Dallas Cowboys players
Mississippi Gulf Coast Bulldogs football players
New York Jets players
Oregon Ducks football players
High school football coaches in Louisiana
Sportspeople from Alexandria, Louisiana
Players of American football from Oakland, California
Players of American football from Louisiana
African-American coaches of American football
African-American players of American football
21st-century African-American sportspeople
20th-century African-American people